Illidops is a genus of braconid wasps in the family Braconidae. There are more than 30 described species in Illidops, found throughout most of the world.

Species
These 37 species belong to the genus Illidops:

 Illidops albostigmalis van Achterberg & Fernández-Triana, 2017
 Illidops aridus Penteado-Dias & Scatolini, 2000
 Illidops assimilis (Papp, 1976)
 Illidops azamgarhensis (Ahmad, 2005)
 Illidops barcinonensis (Marshall, 1898)
 Illidops bellicosus (Papp, 1977)
 Illidops blandus (Tobias & Kotenko, 1986)
 Illidops butalidis (Marshall, 1889)
 Illidops buteonis (Kotenko, 1986)
 Illidops cloelia (Nixon, 1965)
 Illidops dauricus Kotenko, 2007
 Illidops electilis (Tobias, 1964)
 Illidops keralensis (Narendran & Sumodan, 1992)
 Illidops kostjuki (Kotenko, 1986)
 Illidops kostylevi (Kotenko, 1986)
 Illidops lamprosemae (Ahmad, 2005)
 Illidops mutabilis (Telenga, 1955)
 Illidops naso (Marshall, 1885)
 Illidops nigritegula (Tobias & Kotenko, 1986)
 Illidops paranaensis Penteado-Dias & Scatolini, 2000
 Illidops perseveratus (Papp, 1977)
 Illidops planiscapus (Tobias, 1976)
 Illidops rostratus (Tobias, 1976)
 Illidops scutellaris (Muesebeck, 1921)
 Illidops sophrosine (Nixon, 1976)
 Illidops splendidus (Papp, 1974)
 Illidops subversor (Tobias & Kotenko, 1986)
 Illidops suevus (Reinhard, 1880)
 Illidops suffectus (Tobias & Kotenko, 1986)
 Illidops terrestris Wharton, 1983
 Illidops tigris (Kotenko, 1986)
 Illidops toreicus Kotenko, 2007
 Illidops trabea (Nixon, 1965)
 Illidops urgens Kotenko, 2004
 Illidops urgo (Nixon, 1965)
 Illidops uvidus Penteado-Dias & Scatolini, 2000
 Illidops vitobiasi Kotenko, 2004

References

Further reading

 
 
 

Microgastrinae